Alan Dubin is an American vocalist/singer most widely known for his role in the now defunct doom metal band Khanate. He is noted for his tortured and distinctive vocal approach. Other bands he has been featured in include OLD and current band Gnaw.

Dubin is also a professional film/video editor with many credits in TV commercials, shows, films, music videos and more.

Studio discography

OLD 

 Old Lady Drivers - 1988
 Lo Flux Tube - 1991
 The Musical Dimensions of Sleastak - 1993
 Hold On To Your Face - 1993
 Formula - 1995

Khanate 

 Khanate - 2001
 Live WFMU 91.1 (2002, Live)
 Things Viral - 2003
 No Joy (Remix) (2003, EP)
 Let Loose The Lambs (2004, Live DVD; limited to 230 copies)
 KHNT vs. Stockholm (2004, Live)
 Live Aktion Sampler 2004 (2004, Live)
 Capture & Release - 2005
 Dead/Live Aktions (2005, DVD)
 It's Cold When Birds Fall From The Sky (2005, Live; limited to 500 copies)
 Clean Hands Go Foul - 2009

Gnaw 

 This Face - 2009
 Horrible Chamber - 2013
 Cutting Pieces - 2017
 Barking Orders - 2020

A Taste For Decay 

 Beneath Black Waters (featured on the track "Approaching Fresh Throats (Of Certain Ghosts To Be)" - 2010

DEATHSTENCH 

 "DEATHSTENCH / Trepaneringsritualen" (featured on the track "Temples of Dust") - 2013
 XI-XVII-MMXV (Live album)- 2018

ÄÄNIPÄÄ 

 Through A Pre-Memory (featured on the tracks "Muse", "Watch Over Stillness / Matters Principle") - 2013

20.SV  

 The Great Sonic Wave - 2013

Second Rope 

 Second Rope - awaiting release 2020

References

 NY Times Filmography
 

American heavy metal singers
Living people
Khanate (band) members
Year of birth missing (living people)
OLD (band) members